The Ancomarca Plateau is an elevated plateau around the Bolivia–Chile–Peru tripoint. It lies at 4,115 m asl. Villages in the plateau include Ancomarca in Peru, Charaña in Bolivia and Visviri in Chile. In colonial times the area of the plateau was organized as an ayllu.

References

Altiplano
 
 
 
Landforms of Arica y Parinacota Region
Landforms of La Paz Department (Bolivia)
Landforms of Tacna Region
Plateaus of the Andes
Plateaus of Bolivia
Plateaus of Chile
Plateaus of Peru